Ashok Kumar Kondabolu (born 1985), also known by his stage name Dapwell (or Dap), is an American actor, writer, and internet personality from Queens, New York City. A graduate of Stuyvesant High School in Manhattan, Kondabolu was first known for being a member of and hype man for the influential New York-based rap group Das Racist. Kondabolu announced that he will eventually release his own solo material. 

Rolling Stone India described Ashok as "New York's stock Joe Gould-like character injected with the creative adrenaline of gonzo journalist Hunter S Thompson and the uncouth coarseness of writer Charles Bukowski." With the breakup of Das Racist in December 2012, Kondabolu stated that he would be focusing his attention on his television and radio show, co-created with Despot, called Chillin' Island.

He is the younger brother of comedian Hari Kondabolu, with whom he conducts the semi-regular live show Untitled Kondabolu Brothers Project as well as the Untitled Kondabolu Brothers Podcast. Kondabolu created and starred in the NYC-centered variety show Hey, How Ya Doin? which aired on BRIC in 2018.

The first season of Chillin Island, starring Kondabolu, along with Despot, and Lakutis, premiered on HBO and HBO Max December 17, 2021.

Discography

With Das Racist
Shut Up, Dude (2010)
Sit Down, Man (2010)
Relax (2011)

With Jean Grae & Quelle Chris
 Everything’s Fine (2018)

See also
 Indians in the New York City metropolitan region
List of notable Stuyvesant High School alumni

References

External links
 
 Chillin Island HBO website
 Hey, How Ya Doin? website
 Untitled Kondabolu Brothers website

American television actors
American television writers
Living people
American people of Telugu descent
Stuyvesant High School alumni
1985 births
American podcasters